Coton is located northeast of Alveley, Shropshire and was associated with the manor Coton Hall. The ancestors of General Robert E. Lee left Coton near Alveley during the 17th century.  At that time the Lee family had been there for some six centuries, and another branch of the Lee family remained in Coton until 1821.

See also
Listed buildings in Alveley

References

External links 

Villages in Shropshire